Mýrdalshreppur is a municipality located in southern Iceland. The main village is Vík.

References 

Municipalities of Iceland